Pilea napoana is a species of plant in the family Urticaceae. It is endemic to Ecuador.  Its natural habitat is subtropical or tropical moist montane forests.

References

Endemic flora of Ecuador
napoana
Vulnerable plants
Taxonomy articles created by Polbot